William Waller (25 January 1923 – 16 January 1998) was a Trinidadian cricketer. He played in two first-class matches for Trinidad and Tobago in 1942/43.

See also
 List of Trinidadian representative cricketers

References

External links
 

1923 births
1998 deaths
Trinidad and Tobago cricketers